is a 2015 Japanese television drama based on the manga written by Esusuke Kuroe about a samurai who time-travelled 150 years to modern day Japan. The series was broadcast by TV Asahi from 13 October to 11 December 2015.

Plot
While committing seppuku during the Bakumatsu period in Japan, Takechi Hanpeita (Ryo Nishikido) finds himself unwittingly transported to modern-day rural Japan. The disconcerted samurai is taken in by a kind-hearted elderly man who runs a tuition centre, much to the dismay of the latter's grandchildren Haruka and Toranosuke. Despite making little effort to conceal his disdain for the Westernisation of his beloved homeland, Hanpeita finds himself slowly adapting to his new life while figuring ways to get back to his wife.

Cast

Ryo Nishikido as Takechi Hanpeita
Ryunosuke Kamiki as Sakamoto Ryōma
Manami Higa as Haruka Saeki
Ryusei Fujii as Toranosuke Saeki
Yuina Kuroshima as Sachiko Akagi
Nicole Ishida as Rio Shinohara
Zen Kajihara as Kiichi Komiyama
Leo Morimoto as Makoto Saeki

References

External links
  
 

Japanese drama television series
TV Asahi television dramas
2015 Japanese television series debuts
2015 Japanese television series endings
Japanese television dramas based on manga